Elizabeth Meeke (13 November 1761 – c. October 1826) was a prolific English author, translator and children's writer, and the stepsister of Frances Burney. She wrote about 30 novels, published by the Minerva Press in the late 18th and early 19th centuries.

Identity
The novels appeared mainly under the name Mrs. Meeke, sometimes under the pseudonym Gabrielli, and a few anonymously. Their author was once assumed to be Mary Meeke, the wife of a Staffordshire vicar, but "Mrs. Meeke" was conclusively identified as Elizabeth Meeke in an article by Simon Macdonald in 2013. She is thought to have died in about October 1826.

Fiction
Meeke's debut novel was Count St Blanchard in 1795. Others include The Abbey of Clugny, The Mysterious Wife, Anecdotes of the Altamont Family and Which is the Man? Her works include several translations from French, such as Elizabeth, or the Exiles of Siberia.

The third edition of Chamber's Cyclopaedia of English Literature in 1903 disparaged her work:

Bibliography

Novels
Count St. Blancard, or the Prejudiced Judge (1795)
The Abbey of Clugny (1795)
Palmira and Ermance (1797)
The Mysterious Wife (as by Gabrielli) (1797)
The Sicilian (anonymous) (1798)
Harcourt (anonymous) (1799)
Ellesmere (1799)
Anecdotes of the Altamont Family (anonymous) (1800)
Which is the Man? (1801)
The Mysterious Husband (as by Gabrielli) (1801)
Midnight Weddings (1802)
Independence (as by Gabrielli) (1802)
Amazement! (1804)
The Old Wife and the Young Husband (1804)
The Nine Days' Wonder (1804)
Something Odd! (anonymous) (1804)
The Wonder of the Village (anonymous) (1805)
Something Strange (as by Gabrielli) (1806)
"There Is a Secret, Find It Out!" (1808)
Langhton Priory (as by Gabrielli) (1809)
Stratagems Defeated (as by Gabrielli) (1811)
Matrimony, the Height of Bliss or Extreme of Misery (1811)
Conscience (1814)
Spanish Campaigns, or The Jew (1815)
The Veiled Protectress, or the Mysterious Mother (1818)
What Shall Be, Shall Be (1823)

Translations
A Tale of Mystery, or Celina, by François Guillaume Ducray-Duminil (1803)
Lobenstein Village, by August Lafontaine (1804) 
Julian, or, My Father's House, by François Guillaume Ducray-Duminil (1807) 
The Unpublished Correspondence of Madame du Deffand (1810)
Messiah, by Friedrich Gottlieb Klopstock (with Mary Collyer) (1811)
Elizabeth, or, the Exiles of Siberia, by Sophie Ristaud Cottin (1817)

Children's books
The Birth-Day Present
Mamma's Gift
The Parent's Offering to a Good Child

References

Sources

External links

Corvey CW3 - Author Page - Mary Meeke at Sheffield Hallam University (based on Corvey collection) 

1761 births
1826 deaths
19th-century English novelists
English women novelists
19th-century English women writers
19th-century British writers